"This Little Girl of Mine" is a rhythm and blues single written and released as a single by Ray Charles in 1955 on the Atlantic label.

"This Little Girl of Mine" played off "This Little Light of Mine", much like the previous "I Got a Woman" and the later "Hallelujah I Love Her So" played off other classic gospel hymns.  And much like those songs, replaced sacred lyrics with secular blues lyrics with doo-wop call and response harmonies.

The song was the B-side to Charles' number-one R&B single, "A Fool for You", and was a charted hit on its own, peaking at number nine on the chart.

The tune was re-made to top 40 pop status in 1958 by The Everly Brothers. It should not be confused with the 1981 Gary U.S. Bonds hit "This Little Girl."

References

1955 singles
1958 singles
Songs written by Ray Charles
Ray Charles songs
Trini Lopez songs
The Everly Brothers songs
1955 songs
Cadence Records singles
Atlantic Records singles